SS Shahzada may refer to:

 SS Shahzada, a British cargo ship, sunk in the Bay of Bengal on 14 July 1927

Ship names